Fayet is a commune in the Aveyron department in southern France.

Geography
The commune is traversed by the river Dourdou de Camarès.

Population

See also
Communes of the Aveyron department

References

Communes of Aveyron
Aveyron communes articles needing translation from French Wikipedia